Eleanor Price (born 22 August 1999) is an Australian representative sweep-oar rower. She has represented at senior World Championships and won medals at World Rowing Cups.

Club and state rowing
Price was raised in Victoria and attended Ruyton Girls' School where she took up rowing. Her senior club rowing has been from the Sydney University Boat Club

Price first made state selection for New South Wales in the 2022 women's senior eight which contested the Queen's Cup at the Interstate Regatta within the Australian Rowing Championships.

International representative rowing
In March 2022 Price was selected in the Australian training squad to prepare for the 2022 international season and the 2022 World Rowing Championships. She rowed in the Australian women's eight at World Rowing Cups II and III taking bronze in Poznan and winning gold in Lucerne. At the 2022 World Rowing Championships at Racize, she was again in the Australian women's senior eight. They made the A final and finished in fifth place.

References

External links
Price at World Rowing

1999 births
Living people
Australian female rowers
People educated at Ruyton Girls' School
21st-century Australian women